The Hotbit HB-8000 is an MSX home computer developed and sold by the Brazilian subsidiary of Sharp Corporation through its EPCOM home computer division in mid-1980s. The MSX machines were very popular in Brazil at the time, and they virtually killed all the other competing 8 bit microcomputers in the Brazilian market.

Versions 1-1.2 
The Hotbit had three versions: 1.0 and 1.1 with gray and white case and 1.2, with a black case and a ROM slightly modified to solve an ASCII table compatibility issue with the other popular Brazilian MSX, the Gradiente Expert.

Technical specifications

Peripherals 

 HB-100: joystick
 HB-2400: tape recorder
 HB-3000 or HB-3001: external modem
 HB-3600: Dual disk drive controller and power supply. Sold in a bundle with one HB-6000 drive
 HB-4000: 80 columns card with the V9938 VDP inside
 HB-4100: 64KB RAM expansion
 HB-6000: 5" disk drive (slim height), 360 KB

Notes

External links 
-Sharp Hotbit

MSX